Secret History or Secret Histories may refer to:
Secret history, a revisionist history highlighting information purportedly suppressed or forgotten

Literature
 The Secret History, a novel by Donna Tartt
 Secret History (book series), a fantasy/science fiction series by Simon R. Green
 The Secret History of the Mongols, a 13th-century Mongol chronicle
 Secret Histories, a Doctor Who anthology edited by Mark Clapham
 Secret History, an account of the court of Justinian I by Procopius
 A Secret History, a 2001 book by Alistair Taylor

Music
 The Secret History (band), a New York City-based band
 A Secret History... The Best of the Divine Comedy, an album

Other uses
Secret History (TV series), a British television documentary series

See also